Manarola railway station (Stazione di Manarola) is located on the Genoa–Pisa railway, Italy. It serves Manarola, which is one of the five towns of the Cinque Terre.

History
The station was inaugurated on 24 October 1874, at the same time as the – line.

Freight operations were introduced in Manarola on 15 September 1913.
 
In 1959, a new passenger building and a loading area for goods were built, as well as a pedestrian tunnel to connect with the town.
 
On 1 December 1949, the station became an assuntoria (a station operated by an agent under contract). It is currently operated as an unstaffed halt.
 
In June and July 2011, the station was also served by the Treni del Mare ("trains of the sea") managed by the private company Arenaways, which became bankrupt shortly afterwards.

Buildings and infrastructure 
The station has two platforms; platform 1 is used mainly by trains to La Spezia and platform 2 by trains to Genoa. 

A pedestrian tunnel gives access to the town centre. Another pedestrian path, built when the line was built, skirts the cliffs to Riomaggiore. It is a well-known tourist destination now called the Via dell'Amore ("the Way of Love"), although it has been closed for some years due to a landslide.

Services 
The station, which RFI manages and classified in 2008 in the silver category, has:
  Ticket counter managed by Cinque Terre National Park.
  ticket machines
  toilets.

Rail services
The station is served by Trenitalia regional services operated under a contract with the region of Liguria.

References

Footnotes

Sources
 
 
 
 
 
 
 

Railway stations in Liguria
Railway stations opened in 1874